Micheal Lubowa is an Anglican bishop who serves in Uganda: he has been Bishop of Central Buganda since consecration on 29 January 2017.

Lubowa is a son of George Sinabulya, the inaugural Bishop of Central Buganda. He was educated at Uganda Christian University and the University of Gloucestershire. Lubowa was ordained a deacon in 2001  and a priest in 2002. He was Archdeacon of Mityana before becoming bishop.

References

21st-century Anglican bishops in Uganda
Uganda Christian University alumni
Anglican bishops of Central Buganda
Alumni of the University of Gloucestershire
Anglican archdeacons in Africa
Year of birth missing (living people)
Living people